Calathosoma is a genus of ground beetles in the family Carabidae. This genus has a single species, Calathosoma rubromarginatum. It is found in New Zealand.

References

External links

 

Migadopinae